The 1994 United States Senate election in Montana was held November 8, 1994 to select the U.S. Senator from the state of Montana. Incumbent U.S. Senator Conrad Burns won re-election to a second term. This was the first time a Republican senator ever won re-election in Montana.

Democratic primary

Candidates 
 Jack Mudd, law professor
 John Melcher, former U.S. Senator
 Becky Shaw, student loan investigator

Results

Republican primary

Candidates 
 Conrad Burns, incumbent U.S. Senator

Results

General election

Candidates 
 Conrad Burns (R), incumbent U.S. Senator
 Jack Mudd (D), law professor

Polling

Results

See also 
 1994 United States Senate elections

References 

1994 Montana elections
Montana
1994